Din Mohammad Jurat is a politician and military general from Afghanistan. He served at several senior position in Afghanistan Government. He was a well known commanders under the role of Ahmad Shah Massoud.
He also led a political movement named Protection of the value of Jihad and resistance. He served as Deputy minister of border and tribal affairs ministry in Karzai's period. after that, he was appointed as Head of intelligence service of the Ministry of Interior affairs. He supported Ashraf Ghani at 2014 election, Later in 2018, he was appointed as vice of the National security council. He served also as president's senior adviser.And in 2021, after that Taliban came to power, he is one of the founders of the National Resistance Council to save the people of Afghanistan, and he is currently one of the leaders of this council.(A.H.J))

Early life and Education
Din Mohammad Jurrat, s/o  Bismellah Jurat, was born on Jan, 15, 1963 in a respected family in Panjshir province of Afghanistan.
He completed secondary education in Rokha High School in Panjsher province. Following his graduation from Abu-Hanifa Maddressa in 1365 he enrolled at Kabul University’s Sharia Law Faculty. His enrolment at Kabul university was coincident with the (Haft Sawar) revolution by the People’s Democratic Party of Afghanistan. The Sawar Revolutionist was against the believes of the Afghan people and Islam. Qazi Bismillah Jurat, the deceased father of Gen. Jurat was one of the well-known public figures’ of Panjsher provinces who was known to religious scholars and had close ties with various influential groups in the society. Jurat's father along with hundreds of his colleagues were arrested by the Soviet back regime of Kabul. He was kept in Jail for a period of time and later released. He was then killed by the regime at that time. Jurat was arrested in 1978 in Panjhser valley later the valley was retaken by Mujahideen. Jurat was put in prison for a while and later released. He joined the group of Mujahideen in Panjhir province. He was given role within the resistance group and his involvement in the resistance and defense team was until the 1987 where he fought along with other Mujahideen against the soviet backed regime. Based on the consultation from head of Mujahideen he left Afghanistan towards Peshawar city of Pakistan. Using the opportunity, Jurat could find out the time to study and complete studies in Pakistan. Following his studies, he was tasked to work on the security affairs of Islamic Party in Pakistan and later was assigned as head of Olympics of Interim government.

Following the victory of Mujahideen, he along with his colleagues returned to Kabul and was introduced to the Ministry of Interior Affairs in a senior role for a five years period. Using the opportunity, he completed police training for 18 months in Police Training Academy of Kabul. Following the collapse of Kabul and the takeover by Taliban, Jurat entered Panjsher and based on the instructions from Ahmad Shah Masood he was assigned as the commander in chief of all Mujahideen forces against Taliban and was assigned to control those liberated territories. 
Jurat following the collapse of Taliban, he was assigned as the General Director Public Security of Police forces in the Ministry of Interior of Afghanistan for a period of two years. Based on the request of Mujahideen forces, religious figures and Panjsher citizens he was assigned as the head of Panjsher People Council. During this time, Jurat could connect the council with other provinces of Afghanistan. He was assigned as the security advisor of the First Vice President and later served as the Deputy Minster of Tribal Affairs of Afghanistan. in 2014, Mr. Jurat as Independent body supported the candidacy of Mohammad Ashraf Ghani as the president of Islamic Republic of Afghanistan. His support to president Ghani’s team was very vital. Jurat in 2015 with the joint effort from the influential people established Protecting the Values of Jihad and Resistance Afghanistan People party. Later in 2018, he was appointed as Vice of the National Security council. He served also as President's senior adviser. And in 2021, after that Taliban came to power, he is one of the founders of the National Resistance Council to save the people of Afghanistan, and he is currently one of the leaders of this council.

See Also
Amrullah saleh
Bismullah Mohammadi
Ahmad zia massoud 
Hamid karzai
Atta mohammad nur
yonus qanuni
Ahmad massoud
Mohammad panah
Hasib qoway markaz
Abdul rashid dostom

References

1963 births
Afghan politicians
Afghan Tajik people
Politicians of Panjshir Province
Afghan Muslims
Living people